Heeii, formerly known as Elkoog B.V., is a company based in Groningen, Netherlands that provides a recommendation service for web browsers by means of a plug-in.  Website visitors that use Heeii recommendations are able to get the most appropriate content links that result in reaching their online objectives.

Technology & Social Science
Heeii is combining human computer interaction research with software engineering techniques to understand the implicit, emergent behaviors of web surfers.  Based on an array of implicit behaviors, Heeii’s technology discerns a user’s intent and dynamically connects them to the content based on the collective wisdom of all visitors with similar interests.

Heeii has built its technology on many of the same social principles as have been popularized by books such as The Long Tail, The Wisdom of Crowds, and Emergence.

Passive Filtering
Implicit approaches, such as the one that Heeii implements, collects the community wisdom that emerges on the web by observing the user behaviors.

See here for a comparison of Active and Passive filtering.

Company history
The company was founded in 2006 by Edwin Kuipers, and is headquartered in Groningen, Netherlands. Elkoog was able to start by taking a round of angel funding from various close business relations and friends. The funding round came to approximately $750,000.

Early 2007 the concept had proven feasible. Because Heeii scales non-linearly, always has to be available, has to respond very rapidly, financing of a sufficient infrastructure had to be realized. Elkoog then took a round of angel funding, a venture capital fund called The Knowledge Conversion Fund, and the ir. G.J. Smid Fund Foundation. This second funding round came to approximately $1.6 million.

By the beginning of 2009 the company raised an additional $2.6 million for marketing in the Netherlands - the company's home base, and the rest of the world.

Also early 2009, Heeii received academic accreditation by becoming a member of the expertise center Target, which is building a sustainable economic cluster of intelligent sensor network information systems in the Northern part of the Netherlands, aimed at data management for very large amounts of data. Prominent scientific research groups and innovative businesses jointly develop and improve complex and scalable data systems. The starting point here is the Target paradigm: full integration of large-scale data processing, archiving and analysis. In these experimental surroundings, the Target model is developed into actual market applications, and participants in follow-up projects will develop further products and services.

Target is a collaboration between
National Astronomical Datacenter OmegaCEN
University Medical Center Groningen (UMCG)
Netherlands Institute for Radio Astronomy (ASTRON) 
Artificial Intelligence at the RuG
Donald Smits Center for Information Technology 
Task24 
Oracle 
IBM
Heeii
Target Holding

Target’s secretary is the University of Groningen. The partners drew up an innovative program of 32 million Euros in total in which they will be investing a total sum of almost 16 million Euros.

See also

 Conversion optimization
 Recommendation system
 Collaborative filtering

References
 Heeii is StumbleUpon Plus Google Suggestions by Kristen Nicole, Mashable, May 15, 2007.
 Heeii - The Dutch Stumbleupon? (Dutch) by Jeroen Bakker, BlueAce, May 17, 2007.
 Heeii, aanraadsysteem voor makkelijk surfen (Dutch) by Denise Lappain, April 26, 2009.

External links
 Company website

Web services